Nellie Carlin (1869–1948) was an American attorney in Chicago.

Career
Carlin graduated from the Chicago College of Law in 1896. She was an associate of Clarence Darrow's law firm from 1896 until 1910. She was the second President of the Women's Bar Association of Illinois and second female Cook County Public Guardian (appointed by Edward Fitzsimmons Dunne). She served as Assistant Cook County State's Attorney from 1918 to 1919, after which she returned to private practice.

References

1869 births
1948 deaths
People from Chicago
Lawyers from Chicago
20th-century American lawyers
19th-century American lawyers
Date of birth missing
Place of birth missing
Date of death missing
Place of death missing
20th-century American women lawyers

19th-century American women lawyers